Maria Stenzel  (born 25 November 1998) is a Polish volleyball player. She is part of the Poland women's national volleyball team.

She participated in the  2015 FIVB Volleyball Girls' U18 World Championship, 2017 FIVB Volleyball Women's U20 World Championship,  and 2018 FIVB Volleyball Women's Nations League.
On club level she played for Grot Budowlani Łódź.

References

External links 
 FIVB profile
 CEV profile
 http://www.norceca.info/news/volleyball/2018/6/yonkaira-and-marte-stand-out-in-dominican-victory.aspx

1996 births
Living people
Polish women's volleyball players
People from Kościan